MV Rusadir is a roll on/roll off passenger vessel launched in 2018 by Flensburger Schiffbau Gesellschaft in Germany. She was to have been operated by Brittany Ferries, but they cancelled the contract in 2020 after extended delays. The incomplete vessel was then taken to Fosen Yard at Trondheim, Norway for completion. As of March 2023 she is expected to operate for Baleària on a 6 month contract.

History
Brittany Ferries ordered the vessel, originally named Honfleur, in June 2017 from German shipbuilder Flensburger Schiffbau-Gesellschaft (FSG) at a cost of about €200 million.  Construction began in March 2018 when the first steel was cut, followed by the laying of the keel several months later.  She was launched in December 2018, and following fitting out was scheduled to be delivered in May 2019 before entering service the following winter season.  Once in service, she was to sail between Portsmouth, England and Caen, France.

The completion of construction and fitting out of Honfleur was delayed by several years, and she was still unfinished, with up to a year estimated to remain until delivery, when Brittany Ferries canceled their order for the ship in June 2020. According to FSG, the incomplete vessel was under the shipyard's ownership at the time, leaving her fate unclear. Subsequently it was reported that, as part of the restructuring of the shipyard, the unfinished ferry would be acquired by the former owner of FSG, Siem Industries, possibly for completion elsewhere. On the 25th October 2020, the former Honfleur (now simply known as FSG 774 after the cancellation) was towed out of the FSG shipyard by two tugs, the Svitzer Thor and Carlo Martello. She was taken to the Fosen Yard near Trondheim, Norway, which was tasked with finishing the cancelled vessel. After her completion, the vessel is to either be chartered or sold on to another operator. As of February 2023 she's in Poland waiting for an operator.

In late February 2023, sources reported that the Spanish ferry company 'Baleària' had decided to charter 'Honfleur' on a 6 month contract, with options to purchase. On March 1, 2023, the vessel was renamed 'Rusadir'. She is expected to operate on the Melilla line.

Design

She can carry up to 1,680 passengers, with 261 individual cabins, and has a 2,600 lane meter freight deck, with a capacity of 130 freight trucks, or 550 passenger cars and 64 trucks.

References

Ships built in Flensburg
2018 ships
Ferries of the United Kingdom
Ferries of France